Fray Bentos is a Uruguayan city on the River Uruguay.

Fray Bentos may also refer to:

 Fray Bentos (food brand), a brand of Baxters and Campbell's Soup Company
 Fray Bentos F.C., a soccer club from Fray Bentos, Uruguay
 Fray Bentos a British Mark IV tank that achieved fame for a 72 hour action in 1917
 Fray Bentos-Puerto Unzué Bridge, an informal denomination of the Libertador General San Martín Bridge

See also
 Bento (disambiguation)
 Bentos (disambiguation)